Edward Wood (fl. 1584–1586) was an English politician.

He was a Member (MP) of the Parliament of England for Sandwich in 1584 and 1586.

References

Year of birth missing
Year of death missing
English MPs 1584–1585
English MPs 1586–1587